Marcel Gerritsen (born 6 January 1967) is a Dutch former professional cross-country mountain biker and cyclo-cross cyclist. He won the silver medal in the cross-country at the 1993 UCI Mountain Bike World Championships.

Major results

Cyclo-cross
1985
 3nd National Junior Championships
1991
 4th UCI Under-23 World Championships

Mountain bike
1993
 2nd  UCI World XCO Championships
1995
 2nd National XCO Championships
 7th European XCO Championships

Road
1992
 2nd Vlaamse Pijl

References

External links

Living people
1967 births
Dutch male cyclists
Dutch mountain bikers
Cyclo-cross cyclists
Sportspeople from Amersfoort
Cyclists from Utrecht (province)
20th-century Dutch people